Memve'ele Hydroelectric Power Station is a 211 megawatt hydroelectric power station in Cameroon. Construction of this dam began in April 2012 and the dam produced its first 80 megawatts in April 2019. Full commercial operations are expected to begin once the 225 kiloVolt high voltage transmission line to Yaounde is completed.

Location
The power station is located at the village of Nyabissan, in Ntem Valey Département, in the South Region of Cameroon, across the Ntem River.

Overview
The development of this power station was originally led by a consortium comprising Globeleq and Sud Energie,
based in the United Kingdom. In May 2009, that consortium backed out of the deal. That same year, Sinohydro, the Chinese state-owned construction company took over the development rights, as engineering, procurement and construction (EPC) contractor.

According to online reports, the construction phase began in earnest after the EPC contract with Sinohydro was executed in April 2012.

The design also calls for a 225kV high voltage evacuation line from the power station to Yaoundé, where most of the generated energy is destined. The installation of three 225kV/90kV transformers at Ebolowa, Nkoumou and Ahala, is part of the design.

Construction costs
Due to multiple delays, the cost for this project has kept increasing over time. In May 2009, the cost estimates were €556 million (approx. US$795 million). As of August 2021, total cost for all the project components totaled US$831.6 million (approx. €727.2 million). As of December 2021, €5 million (approx. US$5.7 million) was still needed to compensate landowners, in order to allow the completion of the high voltage electricity evacuation line.

Funding
The table below illustrates the funding sources for the power station, evacuation line and associated infrastructure, including electricity substations.

Operations
The energy generated at this power station is sold to Eneo Cameroon SA, the national electricity utility company.

See also

List of power stations in Cameroon
Nachtigal Hydroelectric Power Station

References

External links
 Provisional Reception of the Memve'ele Hydroelectric Dam As of 8 May 2018.

Power stations in Cameroon
South Region (Cameroon)
Hydroelectric power stations in Cameroon
Energy infrastructure under construction